Ch'ilgol station is a railway station in Kallimgil-dong, Man'gyŏngdae-guyŏk, P'yŏngyang, North Korea, on the P'yŏngnam Line of the Korean State Railway.

Both passenger and freight trains use the station. There is a spur to the P'yŏngyang Wheat Flour Factory in Samhŭng-dong, and there are freight houses and loading platforms at the south side of the station.

On 11 February 1934, the Chosen Government Railway opened Choch'on station on the P'yŏngnam line. However, a year later it was dismantled and moved 1.2 km south, becoming today's Ch'ilgol station, opening on 1 October 1935.

See also
Chilgol
Chilgol Church

References

Railway stations in North Korea
Buildings and structures in Pyongyang
Transport in Pyongyang
Railway stations opened in 1934
1934 establishments in Korea